The Tomb of Hamdallah Mustawfi (Persian: آرامگاه حمدالله مستوفی) is a 14th century mausoleum in Qazvin, Iran. The mausoleum belongs to Hamdallah Mustawfi. It has a square base and a conical roof. It was listed in Iran's national heritage sites with the number 332 on February 10, 1940.

References 

Tombs in Iran
Mausoleums in Iran
Qazvin
Buildings and structures in Qazvin Province
14th century in Iran
Buildings and structures completed in the 14th century
National works of Iran